The Marines Come Thru is a 1938 American action film directed by Louis J. Gasnier and written by D.S. Leslie and Jack Kofoed for Grand National Pictures. The film stars Wallace Ford, Toby Wing, Grant Withers, Sheila Lynch, Michael Doyle and Don Lanning. The film was rereleased on July 8, 1943, by Astor Pictures as Fight On, Marines.

Plot

Cast           
Wallace Ford as Pvt. 'Singapore' Stebbins
Toby Wing as Linda Dale
Grant Withers as Pvt. Jack 'Junior' Murray
Sheila Lynch as Maisie King
Michael Doyle as Lt. Steve Landers
Don Lanning as Dick Weber
Frank Rasmussen as Beckstrom
Roy Elkins as Charles
James Neary as Top Sergeant
Thomas McKeon as Col. Dale

References

External links
 

1938 films
American action films
1940s action films
Grand National Films films
Astor Pictures films
Films directed by Louis J. Gasnier
American black-and-white films
Films about the United States Marine Corps
1940s English-language films
1930s English-language films